The 1995–96 Argentine Primera División was a season of top-flight professional football in Argentina. The league season had Vélez Sársfield winning both, Apertura and Clausura championships (3rd. and 4th. league titles for the club). Estudiantes de La Plata (as champion of 1994–95 Primera B Nacional) and Colón de Santa Fe (winner of "Torneo Octogonal" after beating San Martín de Tucumán in a two-legged series) promoted from the Primera B Nacional (second division).

On the other hand, Belgrano (Córdoba) and Argentinos Juniors were relegated to Primera B Nacional.

The 1994 Apertura was the first season in which the league implemented a system awarding 3 points per match won, after FIFA had ruled it worldwide.

Torneo Apertura

League table

Top scorers

Torneo Clausura

League standings

Top scorers

See also
1995–96 in Argentine football

References

Argentine Primera División seasons
1
Argentine
Argentine